Lloyd Carpenter Griscom (November 4, 1872 – February 8, 1959) was an American lawyer, diplomat, and newspaper publisher.

Early life
Lloyd Griscom was born on November 4, 1872, at Riverton, New Jersey.  He was the son of shipping magnate Clement Griscom (1841–1912) and Frances Canby Biddle (1840–1923).  Among his siblings was Frances Griscom, an amateur golfer who won the 1900 U.S. Women's Amateur held at Shinnecock Hills Golf Club in Southampton, New York, She and played in the 1898 Amateur at the Ardsley Club.

He graduated in 1891 from the law department of University of Pennsylvania and a member of the Sigma Chapter of the Zeta Psi Fraternity. Griscom continued his legal studies at the New York Law School.   He later received a Doctor of Laws from the University of Pennsylvania in 1907.

Career

In 1893–1894, Griscom served in the United Kingdom as secretary to Ambassador Thomas Bayard; he was admitted to the bar in 1896, and the following year in 1897 he was deputy district attorney of New York.  During the Spanish–American War, he served as captain and assistant quartermaster.

After a short period as Secretary of Legation and chargé d' affaires at Constantinople, Griscom was appointed Minister to Persia in 1901.  He held the corresponding post in Japan (1902–1906) and was ambassador to Brazil (1906–1907) and to Italy (1907–1909).

In 1911, he became a member of the law firm of Beekman, Menken, and Griscom, New York City, and was thereafter active in local Republican politics, helping found The New York Young Republican Club. He contributed numerous articles to the Philadelphia Sunday Press on travel in Central America.  In 1917, he was appointed a major in the department of the Adjutant-General of the United States Army and afterwards became Assistant Adjutant-General.  During the war, she served as liaison officer to General John J. Pershing, commander of the American Expeditionary Forces of the U.S. Army.  He was a close friend of Col. Theodore Roosevelt Jr.

Griscom's primary significance was as an advocate for globalized free trade as a means to promote peaceful development in accordance with his Quaker faith. In the Middle East he worked for better relations between Muslims and Christians, and he played a major role in the relief effort in Italy after the 1908 Messina earthquake took 50,000 lives.
Prior to the death of Secretary of State John Hay in 1905, Griscom was offered the post of First Assistant Secretary of State. The appointment of Elihu Root to succeed Hay nullified Griscom's appointment to the State Department position.

Later life
Following his retirement from public service, he bought and became the publisher of several Long Island newspapers, including the East Norwich Enterprise, the North Hempstead Record, and the Nassau Daily Star. Griscom purchased the Tallahassee [Florida] Democrat in 1929 owning it until his death in 1959.  He was a cousin by marriage to Wolcott Gibbs, who later worked at several of Griscom's Long Island newspapers.

Griscom studied painting under John Singer Sargent.

Personal life
On November 2, 1901, Griscom was married to Elizabeth Duer Bronson (1877–1914), the daughter of lawyer Frederic Bronson.  Her mother, Sarah Gracie King, was the granddaughter of U.S. Representative James Gore King and William Alexander Duer.  Through Elizabeth's uncle, Frederick Gore King, she was the first cousin of Alice Gore King.  The Bronsons lived at 174 Madison Avenue and had a country home, "Verna" in Southport, Connecticut (which later became the Fairfield Country Day School). Together, they were the parents of:

 Bronson Winthrop Griscom (1907–1977), who married Sophie Gay, the niece of painter Walter Gay, in 1931.
 Lloyd Preston Griscom (b. 1913).

After her death in 1914, he remarried to Audrey Margaret Elizabeth Crosse (1900–1975) in England on October 3, 1929.  Audrey was the daughter of Marlborough Crosse and the niece of C. E. Barnwell Ewins of Marston Trussell Hall in Leicestershire.  His best man at the wedding was Brig. Gen. Sir Charles Delmé-Radcliffe (who married the daughter of Sir Frederick Treves, 1st Baronet), who was British military attaché at Rome while Griscom was envoy there.

Griscom died of a stroke on February 8, 1959, at Archbold Memorial Hospital in Thomasville, Georgia while visiting his sister Frances who was a patient there.  After his death, his widow, who inherited the bulk of his estate including the Leon county Luna Plantation as well as the Tallahassee Democrat, which she ran from 1958 through 1965.

References
Salvatore Prisco, "Progressive Era Diplomat: Lloyd C. Griscom and Trade Expansion," DIPLOMACY & STATECRAFT, 18 (September 2007), 539–549.

References

External links
Lloyd Carpenter Griscom at the United States Department of State website.

1872 births
1959 deaths
People from Riverton, New Jersey
University of Pennsylvania Law School alumni
New York Law School alumni
American military personnel of the Spanish–American War
Military personnel from New Jersey
United States Army officers
United States Army personnel of World War I
Quartermasters
Honorary Knights Commander of the Order of St Michael and St George
Ambassadors of the United States to Iran
Ambassadors of the United States to Italy
Ambassadors of the United States to Japan
Ambassadors of the United States to Brazil
People from Lower Merion Township, Pennsylvania
Lawyers from Philadelphia
New York (state) Republicans
20th-century American diplomats